Nattawut Jantaweemol (born 11 November 1968), later Muangchai Jantaweemol, known professionally as Muangchai Kittikasem, is a Thai former professional boxer who competed between 1988 to 1999. He is the first Thai to be a world champion in two weight classes, having held the IBF junior-flyweight title from 1989 to 1990 and the WBC and lineal flyweight title from 1991 to 1992.

Muay Thai career
Kittikasem claims to have fought around forty to fifty Muay Thai fights, using the ring names Jingjok Uvichaiyont and Muangchai Singnonsuan but never won any championships. He changed to boxing when a promoter needed a short-term replacement on one of his cards. In professional boxing, he had three managers were Kitti Akkraseranee, Song Karnchanachoosak and Songchai Rattanasuban.

Professional boxing career
The relentless pressure fighter Kittikasem started to fight professionally in 1988.
In only his 7th bout 1989 he won the IBF junior-flyweight title on points against Filipino Tacy Macalos and defended it against the same fighter by KO. After two defenses, he went to the United States to defend the crown against undefeated amateur star Michael Carbajal in 1990. In the bout, he was knocked down four times by the American and injured his chin during the 7th round. His chin became his major weakness since then.

He went up in weight and won the WBC and lineal flyweight title by KO in a 6-round fight against his countryman Sot Chitalada the very next year. Kittikasem KOd Jung Koo Chang and stopped Chitalada once again in the rematch.

He lost another title to another amateur world champion, Russian Yuri Arbachakov, in 1992. The fight took place in Japan, and ended in an explosive KO when Kittikasem ran right in a counter. In 1993, he was KO'd one more time by Arbachakov, this time in Thailand.

He had a couple more fights but never contended again.

Retirement

After out of boxing he ran a used car dealership in Thawi Watthana District, suburb Bangkok until 2011 when it was flooded. These days he is a local politician in Bang Bon District under the Pheu Thai Party, he had previously run for local elections in Bangkok twice but not successful.

For family life he is divorced and has two children. Kittikasem hailed Carbajal as the best opponent he had ever faced.

Professional boxing record

Muay Thai record

|-  style="background:#cfc;"
| 1988-04-29|| Win||align=left| Seesod Sahakarnosot ||  || Bangkok, Thailand || KO || 2 || 

|-  style="background:#cfc;"
| 1988-04-12|| Win||align=left| Eddie Sitwatsiripong ||  || Bangkok, Thailand || KO || 2 || 

|-  style="background:#cfc;"
| 1988-02-05|| Win||align=left| Sittichai Monsongkram ||  || Bangkok, Thailand || KO || 2 || 

|-  style="background:#cfc;"
| 1988-01-05|| Win||align=left| Wanthongchai Sitdaothong ||  || Bangkok, Thailand || KO || 3 || 

|-  style="background:#cfc;"
| 1987-10-06|| Win||align=left| Yodsuwan Sityodtong ||  || Bangkok, Thailand || Decision || 5 || 3:00 

|-  style="background:#cfc;"
| 1987-09-08|| Win||align=left| Sittichok Monsongkhram ||  || Bangkok, Thailand || KO || 3 || 

|-  style="background:#fbb;"
| 1987-05-15|| Loss||align=left| Kawnar Bualuangprakanphay||  || Bangkok, Thailand || Decision || 5 || 3:00

|-  style="background:#cfc;"
| 1987-05-15|| Win||align=left| Sittichok Monsongkhram ||  || Bangkok, Thailand || KO || 3 ||  

|-  style="background:#fbb;"
| 1987-03-21|| Loss ||align=left| Khunpon Sor.Wattana ||  || Bangkok, Thailand || Decision|| 5 || 3:00  

|-  style="background:#cfc;"
| 1987-01-06|| Win||align=left| Superlek Chor.Sawat ||  || Bangkok, Thailand || KO || 2 ||  
|-
| colspan=9 | Legend:

See also
List of flyweight boxing champions
List of light flyweight boxing champions
List of WBC world champions
List of IBF world champions

References

External links
 
 Muangchai Kittikasem - CBZ Profile

|-

1968 births
Light-flyweight boxers
Flyweight boxers
World boxing champions
World flyweight boxing champions
World Boxing Council champions
International Boxing Federation champions
Living people
Muangchai Kittikasem
Muangchai Kittikasem
Muangchai Kittikasem
Muangchai Kittikasem